Edmond Dosti (born 5 February 1966) is a retired Albanian footballer who played as a striker.

Club career
He has played as a striker for Partizani Tirana in Albania and also Olimpija Ljubljana in Slovenia. He was the Albanian Superliga top goalscorer for the 1992–1993 season with 21 goals; that season he also won a league title with Partizani Tirana, playing alongside fellow international players Adnan Ocelli and Artan Bano.

International career
He was also a member of the Albania national football team from 1991 to 1995. In total he made four appearances for Albania national football team, all of them were as substitutes.

Personal life
Currently he lives in Graz city of Austria and he is manager of "Bar Austria" in Tirana with his brother Vladimir Dosti a football players manager.

Honours
Partizani
Albanian Superliga: 1992–93

Olimpija Ljubljana
Slovenian PrvaLiga: 1994–95

References

External sources
 
 Profile at Playerhistory.com

1969 births
Living people
Footballers from Tirana
Albanian footballers
Association football forwards
Albania international footballers
FK Partizani Tirana players
KF Laçi players
KS Kastrioti players
NK Olimpija Ljubljana (1945–2005) players
SC Eisenstadt players
Albanian expatriate footballers
Expatriate footballers in Slovenia
Albanian expatriate sportspeople in Slovenia
Expatriate footballers in Austria
Albanian expatriate sportspeople in Austria
Expatriate footballers in Germany
Albanian expatriate sportspeople in Germany